Laxmipur may refer to:
 Lakshmipur District, Bangladesh
 Lakshmipur Sadar Upazila
 Laxmipur, Dang Deokhuri, Nepal
 Laxmipur, Jhapa, Nepal
 Laxmipur, Mahakali, Nepal
 Laxmipur, Narayani, Nepal
 Laxmipur, Salyan, Nepal
 Laxmipur (Odisha Vidhan Sabha constituency), India
 Laxmipur, Narayanpet district, Telangana, India
 Lakshmipur, Jamui, Bihar

See also
 Lakshmipur, Orissa, a village